The Movement for Reversal (PZP) is a centre-left political organization in Serbia. Its leader is Janko Veselinović, a professor at the University of Novi Sad.

History 
Movement for Reversal was found in 2015, by a Serbian academic Janko Veselinović, who decided to split from the Social Democratic Party, claiming that its leadership does not have a clear vision of how to counter the Serbian Progressive Party and the Socialist Party of Serbia. 

The organization participated in the 2016 Serbian parliamentary elections in a coalition along with the Serbian Left and the Social Democratic Union. However, the coalition finished ninth with 0.94% of the votes and failed to pass the census.

In 2018, the organization was one of the founding members of the major opposition coalition called the Alliance for Serbia. The coalition boycotted the 2020 Serbian parliamentary elections.

Presidents

Electoral performance

Parliamentary elections

Presidential elections

References 

Political parties established in 2015
Pro-European political parties in Serbia
Social democratic parties in Serbia
2015 establishments in Serbia